The Africa Movie Academy Award for Achievement In Screen Play is an annual merit by the Africa Film Academy to recognise the best African films of the preceding year.

References

Lists of award winners
Africa Movie Academy Awards